Menchakovo is a rural locality (a selo) in Seletskoye Rural Settlement, Suzdalsky District, Vladimir Oblast, Russia. The population was 88 as of 2010. There are 4 streets.

Geography 
Menchakovo is located on the Irmes River, 10 km northwest of Suzdal (the district's administrative centre) by road. Romanovo is the nearest rural locality.

References 

Rural localities in Suzdalsky District